This is a list of opinion polls for the 2007 Scottish Parliament election. The first figure for each party is for the 1st, first-past-the-post, constituency, vote; the second figure is for the 2nd, proportional representation, regional, vote. The Scottish Greens and the Scottish Socialist Party ran only one constituency candidate each in the 2007 election (the Greens in Glasgow Kelvin and the SSP in Paisley North) so constituency values in polls for those parties have little meaning.

ICM, Ipsos MORI, Populus, YouGov and TNS System Three (a subsidiary of Taylor Nelson Sofres) are all members of the British Polling Council (BPC), and therefore fully disclose the methodology used, and publish tables of the detailed statistical findings. Scottish Opinion (a brand of Progressive Partnership) and mruk are not BPC members.

Constituency vote

Regional vote

Seat predictions
The Scotsman stated that the findings of their 3 April poll would produce a seat distribution as follows: SNP 44 MSPs (+17), Labour 39 MSPs (-11), Liberal Democrats 24 MSPs (+7), Conservative 15 MSPs (-3).

The Sunday Times (12 January) stated that the findings of their poll would produce a seat distribution as follows: Labour 42 MSPs (-8), SNP 38 MSPs (+11), Liberal Democrats 19 MSPs (+2), Conservative 17 MSPs (-1), Greens 9 MSPs (+2), others 4 MSPs (-6).

Constitutional issue
Several polls were carried out on whether voters would support independence for Scotland, a key issue in this election and a central policy of the SNP. However, the results of such polls have historically been proven to be sensitive to the wording of the question used.

On 10 September 2006, The Sunday Times Scotland published an opinion poll conducted by YouGov. 1176 respondents were interviewed between 5 September and 7 September 2006. The survey found that 44% were in favour of Scottish independence when asked "If there were a referendum tomorrow on whether Scotland should become an independent country, separate from the rest of the United Kingdom, how would you be inclined to vote?" 42% were against, and 15% did not know. 64% were in favour of giving the Scottish Parliament more powers, with 19% disagreeing.
A September 2006 poll by the research agency YouGov showed that 44% of respondents said they would back a separate Scotland in an independence referendum compared with 42% who did not.
A poll by The Scotsman in October 2006 suggested that 51% of Scots would be in favour of independence, with 39% against.
A Daily Telegraph poll showed that a significant proportion of Britons would accept the breakup of the UK.
On 1 November 2006, The Scotsman published an opinion poll conducted by ICM. The survey found that 51% were in favour of independence, with 37% against.

When polls give three options, including an option for greater devolution but stopping short of independence, support for full independence is much lower. In a poll by The Times, published on 20 April 2007, given a choice between independence, the status quo, or greater powers for the Scottish Parliament within the United Kingdom, the latter option had majority support (56%) with only 22% supporting full independence. Even among SNP voters, more (47%) supported a more powerful Parliament than full independence (45%).

Other issues

On 4 April 2007, the BBC published the findings of a poll it had commissioned from ICM. The 1001 respondents were asked to rank a given list of issues, in the order which they thought "should be the priorities of the new parliament?" The respondents ranked the main issues as follows:

1. Schools/health

2. Police on streets

3. Council tax for 65s+

4. Local hospitals

5. Farming/fishing

6. Young offenders curfew

7. Free school meals

8. Buses/trains (not roads)

9. Scrap tuition fees

10. Community sentences

References

Scotland 2007
Opinion polling for Scottish Parliament elections
Opinion polling for United Kingdom votes in the 2000s